Sid and Nancy (also known as Sid and Nancy: Love Kills) is a 1986 British biographical film directed by Alex Cox, co-written with Abbe Wool, and starring Gary Oldman and Chloe Webb. The film portrays the life of Sid Vicious, bassist of the punk rock band the Sex Pistols, and his destructive relationship with girlfriend Nancy Spungen. The film also features supporting performances from David Hayman, Xander Berkeley, and Courtney Love.

The film premiered at the Cannes Film Festival in  May 1986, and was released theatrically in the United States in November of that same year. Although it failed to recoup its production budget at the box office, the film was received positively by most critics and developed a cult following.

Plot
On 12 October 1978, police are summoned to the Hotel Chelsea in New York City, where they find  Nancy Spungen dead. Her boyfriend, Sex Pistols bassist Sid Vicious, is taken into custody. Sid is driven to a police station and told to describe what happened. 

A little more than a year earlier, in 1977, close friends and band members Sid and Johnny Rotten meet Nancy, a heroin-addicted American groupie who had come to London to bed the Sex Pistols. Sid dismisses her at first, as her intentions are obvious, but begins dating her after feeling sympathy for the rejection she faces from fellow punk performers. The two swiftly bond over heroin use, and it is implied that Nancy introduces Sid to the drug.

Sid and Nancy fall deeply in love, but their self-destructive, drug-fueled relationship frays Sid's relationship with the rest of the band. Nancy is distraught when Sid departs on a month-long American tour without her. The tour is notably disastrous, with Sid strung out of his mind, often drunk or on methamphetamine, and physically violent. Phoebe, Sid's friend and road manager, unsuccessfully attempts to help him stop drinking. Meanwhile, Nancy remains in London, staying with her friend Linda, a dominatrix. Although several of Sid's friends and acquaintances warn him of Nancy's devastating effect on his life, Sid stubbornly ignores these warnings. On 17 January 1978, in the midst of the group's American tour, the band breaks up.

Sid reunites with Nancy in New York City, and he attempts to start a solo career with Nancy as his manager. The two visit Paris to begin recording sessions, but the trip is unfruitful. Sid is quickly dismissed in the music industry as a has-been, and he and Nancy descend deeper into heroin addiction; Nancy also begins suffering from severe depression, and the couple eventually make a suicide pact. Nancy brings Sid to Philadelphia to meet her family, who are horrified by the couple's reckless behavior and physical state. Sid and Nancy return to New York and settle in the Hotel Chelsea, where they live in squalor and depend on opiates supplied by their drug dealer, Bowery Snax.

Their love affair ends tragically one night when, during an argument in which Sid announces his plans to stop using heroin and return to England to restart his life, a suicidal Nancy begs him to kill her. She attacks him and they fight in a drug-induced haze, leading to him stabbing her, although whether it was intentional is left to interpretation. They fall asleep and later Nancy awakes and stumbles into the bathroom, where she collapses and dies. Sid is bailed out temporarily by his mother, who is also a heroin addict. After Sid wanders to a pizzeria and eats a pizza, some street kids convince him to dance with them. A taxi appears and picks Sid up, and he believes he finds Nancy alive in the back seat. The two embrace as the cab drives off.

A postscript says that Vicious died of a heroin overdose, and lastly reads: "R.I.P. Nancy and Sid."

Cast

Production

Development
The film, originally titled Love Kills, is largely based on the mutually destructive, drug- and sex-filled relationship between Vicious and Nancy. Vicious' mother, Anne Beverley, initially tried to prevent the film from being made. After meeting with director Cox, however, she decided to help the production; for example, Beverley gave Oldman Vicious' own heavy metal chain and padlock to wear in the film. Some of the supporting characters are composites, invented to streamline the plot.

Casting
According to director Cox, he had originally considered Daniel Day-Lewis for the part of Sid Vicious; however, Cox offered Oldman the part of Vicious after seeing him play the lead role of Scopey in a 1984 production of Edward Bond's The Pope's Wedding. Oldman twice turned down the role before accepting it, because, in his own words: "I wasn't really that interested in Sid Vicious and the punk movement. I'd never followed it. It wasn't something that interested me. The script I felt was banal and 'who cares' and 'why bother' and all of that. And I was a little bit sort-of with my nose in the air and sort-of thinking 'well the theatre – so much more superior' and all of that." He reconsidered based on the salary and the urging of his agent. He lost weight to play the emaciated Vicious by eating nothing but "steamed fish and lots of melon", but was briefly hospitalized when he lost too much. Oldman later dismissed the performance, saying: "I don't think I played Sid Vicious very well".

Courtney Love recorded a video audition for the role of Spungen. Cox was impressed by Love's audition, but has said the film's investors insisted on an experienced actress for the co-leading role. Therefore, instead, Cox wrote the minor role of Gretchen, one of Sid and Nancy's New York junkie friends, specifically for her benefit. Cox would later cast Love as one of the leads in Straight to Hell (1987). Chloe Webb, who had appeared in several small television roles at the time, was instead cast in the role of Spungen.

In his 2007 autobiography, Guns N' Roses guitarist Slash revealed that the casting director hired all five members of Guns N' Roses as extras for a club scene, having coincidentally scouted them in different locations without their knowledge. He said "all of us showed up to the first day of casting, like 'Hey...what are you doing here?'" However, Slash was the only one in the group to stay for the entire shoot.

Webb and Oldman improvised the dialogue heard in the scene leading up to Spungen's death but based it on interviews and other materials available to them. The stabbing scene is fictionalized and based only on conjecture. Cox told the NME: "We wanted to make the film not just about Sid Vicious and punk rock, but as an anti-drugs statement, to show the degradation caused to various people is not at all glamorous."

The original music is by Pray for Rain, Joe Strummer, and The Pogues. A track by Tears for Fears ("Swords and Knives") was also recorded for the film but was rejected by the filmmakers for not being "punk" enough. The track later appeared on the band's Seeds of Love album in 1989.

Prominent musicians made appearances in the film including Circle Jerks, Love, Iggy Pop, Nico and Edward Tudor-Pole of Tenpole Tudor.

Filming
The film was primarily shot in London and New York City, though additional photography (particularly the sequences of the Sex Pistols' North American tour) was completed in Los Angeles and El Centro, California.

Release

Critical reception
From the 65 reviews collected by review aggregator Rotten Tomatoes, the film received an overall approval rating of 88%, with the consensus: "Visceral, energetic, and often very sad, Sid & Nancy is also a surprisingly touching love story, and Gary Oldman is outstanding as the late punk rock icon Sid Vicious." Roger Ebert gave Sid and Nancy four-out-of-four in his review for The Chicago Sun-Times, writing that Cox and his crew "pull off the neat trick of creating a movie full of noise and fury, and telling a meticulous story right in the middle of it." Appearing on The Late Show Starring Joan Rivers, Ebert said, to agreement from Rivers and applause from the audience, that Oldman "definitely won't be [Oscar] nominated – and should be", this being for the reason that "Hollywood will not nominate an actor for portraying a creep, no matter how good the performance is". In a subsequent article on Oldman, Ebert referred to the movie's titular couple as "punk rock's Romeo and Juliet."

In his book Sid Vicious: Rock N' Roll Star, Malcolm Butt describes Webb's performance as Spungen as "intense, powerful, and most important of all, believable." Oldman's portrayal of Vicious was ranked #62 in Premiere magazine's "100 Greatest Performances of All Time". Uncut magazine ranked Gary Oldman as #8 in its "10 Best actors in rockin' roles" list, describing his portrayal as a "hugely sympathetic reading of the punk figurehead as a lost and bewildered manchild." In 2011, Total Film said of the performance: "It's an early high point in Oldman's varied career that showed just what the young actor was made of. Playing the part of an icon known and beloved by many comes with its own demands and risks, but Oldman more than rises to the challenge, completely transforming into the troubled punk bassist." The magazine described Oldman's rendition of "My Way" as "fantastic – [it] might even be better than Sid's original version." In 2003, Rolling Stone ranked Sid and Nancy as the third-best rock movie ever made, and in 2014, ShortList named it the ninth-greatest music biopic of all time.

Not all reviews of the film were positive. Leslie Halliwell, in a negative appraisal, reiterated a line from a review that appeared in Sight & Sound: "Relentlessly whingeing performances and a lengthy slide into drugs, degradation and death make this a solemnly off-putting moral tract."

Andrew Schofield was ranked #1 in Uncut magazine's "10 Worst actors in rockin' roles", which described his performance as Sex Pistols lead singer Johnny Rotten (real name John Lydon) as a "short-arse Scouse Bleasdale regular never once looking like he means it". Commentary on the Criterion DVD dismisses the film's portrayal of Lydon as wholly inaccurate. Paul Simonon of The Clash also criticised the movie for portraying Lydon as "some sort of fat, bean-slurping idiot."

Although not a box office success (generating $2,826,523 in the U.S. on a $4 million budget), Sid and Nancy has become a cult hit; Yahoo! Movies described the film as a "poignant and uncompromising cult classic".

John Lydon's reaction
Lydon commented on the film in his 1994 autobiography, Rotten: No Irish, No Blacks, No Dogs:

Strummer claimed to have met with Alex Cox for the first time after the completion of the film, at a wrap party, but this is not entirely accurate. The wrap party was the conclusion of the London phase of the filming, which was followed by filming in Los Angeles and New York City, performed by a largely different crew. The pair's meeting involved discussion over soundtrack work for the film, not the film's script.

In a later interview, Lydon was asked the question, "Did the movie get anything right?" to which he replied: "Maybe the name Sid." Cox's attitude toward his subjects was negative; one of the reasons he was attracted to the project was that he was afraid that if someone else made it, it would portray its subjects as "real exemplars of Punk, rather than sold-out traitors to it." He acknowledged that Lydon's hatred of the movie was "understandable, given that it was based on incidents from his life and centred around one of his friends." Neither original bassist Glen Matlock nor guitarist Steve Jones have been as outspoken about the movie as Lydon, although Lydon claimed that drummer Paul Cook was more upset over the movie than he was.

According to Cox, both he and Andrew Schofield (who played Lydon in the film) did meet with Lydon before the filming. According to Cox, Lydon noticed that Schofield was, like Cox, a Liverpudlian, rather than a Londoner like Lydon, and encouraged him to play the part as a Scouser rather than a Londoner. Cox took this as a sign that both of them agreed that it would be better to portray a more fictionalized version of the characters rather than a cold re-telling of facts. Cox claims that Lydon drank heavily at these meetings, which may explain why Lydon did not recall them. Cox stated in a book that contrary to Lydon's claims, his meeting with Schofield was not after the film's completion, but rather before Schofield had even been given the part. He was offered the part the next day.

Awards and nominations

Soundtrack
The official soundtrack contains no songs by either the Sex Pistols or Sid Vicious. Much of the film's soundtrack (as opposed to soundtrack album) was composed by Dan Wool (of Pray for Rain) and Joe Strummer, who was contractually limited to contribute only two songs. Strummer continued to contribute more (unpaid) work because of his interest in the project and composing for film in general. This additional material was credited to fictitious bands in the credits, so as to keep Strummer's label, Epic Records, from knowing what he had done. Another large portion of the music was composed by The Pogues.

Home media
Sid and Nancy was first released on DVD by The Criterion Collection in the late 1990s; this version has since gone out of print. Metro-Goldwyn-Mayer (the video distributor of the catalog of Embassy Pictures, which released the film on VHS) released the film on DVD in 2000. The Criterion Collection released the film on Blu-ray and DVD on 24 August 2017.

References

Sources

External links

 
 
 
 
 
 Sid & Nancy an essay by Jon Savage at the Criterion Collection

1986 films
1980s English-language films
1980s biographical drama films
1980s musical drama films
British biographical drama films
British independent films
British musical drama films
Biographical films about musicians
Films about heroin addiction
Films directed by Alex Cox
Films set in London
Films set in New York (state)
Films set in the 1970s
Films shot in California
Films shot in London
Films shot in New Jersey
Films about mental health
Drama films based on actual events
Musical films based on actual events
Punk films
Cultural depictions of the Sex Pistols
Films produced by Eric Fellner
The Samuel Goldwyn Company films
1986 drama films
1980s British films